Mohamed Doumbia (born 25 December 1998) is an Ivorian professional footballer who plays as a midfielder for Slovan Liberec in the Czech First League.

Career
He started his youth career at Majestic FC in the Ivory Coast. He made his senior league debut for Finnish club Ekenäs IF on 6 May 2017 in their 0–2 home loss to FF Jaro. He signed for Czech First League side Dukla Prague in December 2017. He started making regular appearances in the starting lineup after the arrival of coach Roman Skuhravý in September 2018, who praised Doumbia's tactical awareness as his main strength. After spending four years at Dukla, Doumbia joined Slovan Liberec in February 2022, signing a contract until June 2024.

References

External links 
 
 
 Mohamed Doumbia profile on the FK Dukla Prague official website

Ivorian footballers
1998 births
Living people
Association football midfielders
Czech First League players
Czech National Football League players
FK Dukla Prague players
FC Slovan Liberec players
Ekenäs IF players
Expatriate footballers in Finland
Expatriate footballers in the Czech Republic
Ivorian expatriate sportspeople in Finland
Ivorian expatriate sportspeople in the Czech Republic
Ivorian expatriate footballers
Footballers from Abidjan